¿Quién Tiene La Razón? (English: Who's Right?) is a Spanish-language talk show. The show is produced by Venevisión International in Miami, Florida, where it is taped. The show's host for all those years is psychologist Nancy Álvarez.

History
Telefutura originally aired this talk show from July 7, 2003, to August 29, 2008, weekday afternoons at 3 pm Central. From November 17, 2008, to August 25, 2011, it was broadcast by Telefutura's parent network Univision weekday mornings at 10 am Central.

In August 2011, Telefutura announced a brand new season of ¿Quién Tiene la Razón?; from September 26 to October 7, 2011, Telefutura broadcast it weeknights at 7 pm Central. From October 10, 2011, to April 30, 2012, Telefutura broadcast it weekdays at 3 pm Central.

In July 2012, Telefutura and Venevisión announced that Dra. Nancy Álvarez would still be the presenter of ¿Quién Tiene la Razón?. As of July 30, 2012, Telefutura is broadcasting new episodes of ¿Quién Tiene la Razón? with Dra. Nancy Álvarez still being the host.

Format
The format of the program consists of presenting two or three distinct cases per show involving families or couples who are in some sort of conflict or disagreement and are seeking counsel on how to resolve their issues.

After sufficient testimony regarding the issue is presented to the host and her panel, the audience is then welcome to give additional feedback to each party as well. At the end of each segment, the "Archis" hand down their opinion on the case based on whose side they believe holds the stronger argument, followed by the audience doing the same.  The host then concludes with her own opinion on the issue and gives final advice to the feuding participants.

Los Archis
During these cases, the host is assisted by a panel of three observers known as "Los Archis" (which is short for either "Los Archiamigos" or "Los Archienemigos", Spanish terms best translated within the show's context as "The Arch-allies" or "The Arch-enemies", depending on whose side of the dispute the panel is leaning towards), who question the parties and can provide advocacy to their situation.

Past Archis included Rafael Mercadante and Paula Arcila.

References

External links 
 

2003 American television series debuts
2008 American television series endings
Venevisión original programming